The Indus College of Engineering is an Indian engineering college located at the outskirts of Coimbatore, Tamil Nadu, and at the foothills of the Western Ghats. The school was established in 2008 and is affiliated with Anna University.

History 
Indus College of Engineering was started in 2008 by the Indus Educational Trust which was founded by Thiru V.P. Prabhakaran.

In 2009, the school became an ISO 9001:2000 certified institution. In 2011, the school was identified as a centre for research by Anna University of Technology, Coimbatore.

Courses 
Under graduate courses

Bachelor of Engineering
 B.E. Mechanical Engineering
 B.E. Civil Engineering
 B.E. Computer Science and Engineering
 B.E. Information Technology
 B.E. Electronics and Communication Engineering
 B.E. Electrical and Electronics Engineering

Post graduate courses
Master of Engineering
 M.E. Applied Electronics
Master of Business Administration (MBA)
Research Programme
 Ph.D in Management

External links

Educational institutions established in 2008
Engineering colleges in Coimbatore
2008 establishments in Tamil Nadu